Helibelton Palacios Zapata (born 11 June 1993) is a Colombian professional footballer who plays as a right-back for Spanish club Elche CF.

Club career
Palacios made his senior debut with Deportivo Cali in 2011. After featuring sparingly, he played the 2014 season on loan at La Equidad before returning to his parent club and winning the league title in 2015.

On 27 December 2016, Deportivo Cali announced the transfer of Palacios to Belgian side Club Brugge KV. After featuring rarely, he returned to his home country on 16 January 2018 to join Atlético Nacional.

On 4 February 2021, free agent Palacios signed for La Liga side Elche CF.

International career

Palacios represented Colombia at under-20 level before making his full international debut in 2015. He also featured for the under-23s in the 2016 Summer Olympics.

Career statistics

Club

Honours

Club 
Deportivo Cali
 Categoría Primera A: 2015 A

Atlético Nacional
 Copa Colombia: 2018

International 
Colombia U20
 South American Youth Football Championship: 2013

References

1993 births
Living people
Sportspeople from Cauca Department
Colombian footballers
Association football defenders
Colombia international footballers
Colombia under-20 international footballers
Footballers at the 2016 Summer Olympics
Olympic footballers of Colombia
Categoría Primera A players
Deportivo Cali footballers
La Equidad footballers
Atlético Nacional footballers
Belgian Pro League players
Club Brugge KV players
Elche CF players
Colombian expatriate footballers
Colombian expatriate sportspeople in Belgium
Expatriate footballers in Belgium
Colombian expatriate sportspeople in Spain
Expatriate footballers in Spain